Lieutenant General Robert Andrew Magowan,  (born 12 September 1967) is a senior Royal Marines officer who serves as the Deputy Chief of the Defence Staff (Financial and Military Capability) since May 2022. He previously served as Commandant General Royal Marines from 2016 to 2017 and again from 2021 to 2022.

Early life and education
Magowan was educated at Queen Elizabeth's Grammar School, Faversham and the University of Southampton.

Military career
Magowan was commissioned into the Royal Marines in 1989. He became Plans Officer at Headquarters 3rd Mechanised Division in 2001, in which role he was deployed to Afghanistan, and then became second-in-command of 42 Commando with which he took part in the 2003 invasion of Iraq. He joined the Cabinet Office Assessment Staff in 2003, was appointed a Member of the Order of the British Empire in the 2005 New Year Honours, and posted to the Afghan Drugs Inter-departmental Unit in 2005, before becoming commanding officer of 30 Commando Information Exploitation Group in 2006. He commanded IX Battle Group in Afghanistan in 2007.

 
Magowan became a Deputy Head in Defence Intelligence in 2009 and Chief of Staff to the National Contingent Commander at the headquarters of the International Security Assistance Force in Kabul in 2012, for which he was appointed a Commander of the Order of the British Empire in the October 2013 Operational Honours. The award recognised "his outstanding contribution in strengthening bonds between British forces and the Afghans". He was appointed Commodore, National Personnel Strategy at Navy Command Headquarters in March 2013, Commandant General Royal Marines in June 2016, and commander of Operation Atalanta in June as well.

Magowan was awarded the United States Commander of the Legion of Merit by General Robert Neller on 10 October 2017. The following month, he was appointed Assistant Chief of Naval Staff (Capability) and Controller of the Navy, before becoming Assistant Chief of the Defence Staff (Capability and Force Design) in December 2018. He was appointed a Companion of the Order of the Bath in the 2018 Birthday Honours. He became Deputy Commander Joint Forces Command, renamed as Strategic Command in January 2020. Magowan was promoted to lieutenant general on 22 January 2020. In April 2021, he was once more appointed as Commandant General Royal Marines, becoming the first person to hold the position twice, along with being the first person to serve in the position as a lieutenant general since 1996. He became Deputy Chief of the Defence Staff (Financial and Military Capability) in May 2022.

Personal life
Magowan is married to Charlotte and together they have two young daughters. He is an accomplished mountaineer, a keen reader of European political history and an amateur cook.

References

 

|-

|-

|-

|-

 

1967 births
Living people
People educated at Queen Elizabeth's Grammar School, Faversham
Alumni of the University of Southampton
Royal Marines generals
British mountain climbers
Companions of the Order of the Bath
Commanders of the Order of the British Empire
Foreign recipients of the Legion of Merit
20th-century Royal Marines personnel
21st-century Royal Marines personnel
British military personnel of The Troubles (Northern Ireland)
Royal Navy personnel of the Iraq War
Royal Navy personnel of the War in Afghanistan (2001–2021)